General Ross may refer to:

Alexander Ross (British Army officer) (1742–1827), British Army lieutenant general
Arthur Edward Ross (1870–1952), Canadian physician and Brigadier-General in the Canadian Expeditionary Force
Charles Ross (British Army officer, born 1667) (1667–1732), Scottish general of the Royal Dragoons
Charles Ross (British Army officer, born 1864) (1864–1930), British Army major general
Henry H. Ross (1790–1862), New York State Militia major general
Hew Dalrymple Ross (1779–1868), British Army general
Jimmy D. Ross (1936–2012), U.S. Army 4-star general 
John Ross (British Army officer, born 1829) (1829–1905), British Army general
John Ross (British Army officer, died 1843) (died 1843), British Army lieutenant general
Lawrence Sullivan Ross (1838–1898), a Confederate States Army brigadier general 
Leonard Fulton Ross (1823–1901), Union Army brigadier general
M. Collier Ross (1927–2003), U.S. Army lieutenant general
Ogden J. Ross (1893–1968), U.S. Army brigadier general and National Guard major general
Richard P. Ross Jr. (1906–1990), U.S. Marine Corps brigadier general
Robert Ross (British Army officer) (1766–1814), British Army major general
Robert Knox Ross (1893–1951), British Army major general
Robin Ross (born 1939), Royal Marines lieutenant general
Thunderbolt Ross, fictional general in Marvel Comics
 General Ross, a fictional general in Indiana Jones media

See also
Attorney General Ross (disambiguation)